Bachelor in Paradise Australia is an Australian elimination-style reality competition television series which is an adaptation of the U.S. series of the same name. It is a spin-off of The Bachelor Australia and The Bachelorette Australia and features previous contestants who have been featured on those shows. The programme is hosted by Osher Günsberg and first premiered on Network Ten on 25 March 2018.

In October 2020, it was announced the series would not be returning to Network 10 in 2021, however it could return in the future.

Plot
The show begins with an uneven number of men (bachelors) and women (bachelorettes). At every rose ceremony, either the men or the women have the power of handing out roses, with control switching each time. Those left without a rose are immediately sent home. New bachelors or bachelorettes are introduced each week, often arriving with a date card. By the end, there will be few couples remaining and they will need to decide whether to continue their relationship outside of Paradise or go their separate ways.

After Paradise
A 'behind-the-scenes' show called After Paradise aired during season 1 after the rose ceremony each week on 10Play. It gave viewers an opportunity to have a peek at what happens in paradise that didn't make it to air. After Paradise was discontinued in season 2 and was replaced by a weekly Insider Guide hosted by Osher Günsberg.

Season summary

Ratings

References

2018 Australian television series debuts
2010s Australian reality television series
2020s Australian reality television series
Australian dating and relationship reality television series
English-language television shows
Network 10 original programming
Television shows filmed in Fiji
Television series by Warner Bros. Television Studios
Australian TV series
Australian television series based on American television series